The Echo River is a river of Minnesota. The most popular species caught here are Smallmouth bass and Walleye.

See also
List of rivers of Minnesota

References

Minnesota Watersheds
USGS Hydrologic Unit Map - State of Minnesota (1974)
FishBrain.com

Rivers of Minnesota